Shawn Lee (born 1963) is an American musician, producer, composer and multi-instrumentalist who currently lives in London, England. He is best known for creating the entire score for the acclaimed 2006 Rockstar Games video game Bully (also known as Canis Canem Edit). His song  Kiss the Sky was featured in the Telltale game Tales from the Borderlands episode 2. He is currently working on an upcoming album Janktone Productions, composed primarily of cheap and fun home-made instruments, currently there is no definitive release date though.

Career
Shawn Lee was born to a mother of Lebanese and American Indian ancestry and a father of Irish American ancestry. Lee has relocated twice in pursuit of his career. He moved to Los Angeles in 1988 where he worked with The Dust Brothers and Jeff Buckley. After being in various bands, performing on The Tonight Show, a publishing deal with EMI and touring on Lollapolooza, Lee moved to London, England. There he signed a solo record deal with Talkin' Loud.

This resulted in an album Discomfort which was only promo released in France 1996. In 2000, Lee released Monkey Boy on Wall of Sound Records. The album included Lee's song "Happiness", which was later recorded by million selling British artist Will Young.

2004 saw the release the album Soul Visa, in Japan only, on Rush Production!. Soul Visa was later released in 2006 worldwide under the BBE label. The album Harmonium was released in 2005 in Japan, again under Rush Production!.

As Shawn Lee's Ping Pong Orchestra, Lee has released 11 albums on US label Ubiquity Records and 1 under his own label Silver Fox Records: Music And Rhythm, Moods And Grooves, Voices and Choices, Strings And Things, A Very Ping Pong Christmas: Funky Treats From Santa's bag, Hits The Hits, Miles Of Styles, Under the Sun, Hooked Up Classics, World Of Funk, Reel To Reel, and Techstar.

Lee's music has appeared in many films such as Ocean's Thirteen, The Break-Up, and Confessions of a Shopaholic, as well as on television series, such as CSI: Miami, Lost, Desperate Housewives, Nip/Tuck, Ugly Betty, and Eastbound and Down, and the Mack Dawg Productions snowboard movie Picture This. Shawn Lee also scored the Rockstar Games video game Bully in 2006. Bully was twice nominated for best score from GameSpot (winner) and Spike VGA (Video Game Awards). He composed some pieces for The Getaway before working on Bully'''s score.

Lee also scored UK/Swiss feature film Save Angel Hope, which is yet to be released. The 2008 surf documentary film Under The Sun also features an original Shawn Lee soundtrack  released on Ubiquity Records.  In 2009, his song "Kiss the Sky" with Nino Moschella was featured on the second-season finale of Life, as well as in the first-season finale of the HBO comedy Eastbound & Down and the penultimate episode of the fifth season of Nip/Tuck.

Lee continues to live in London working on an array of new albums in his studio "Trans-Yank." These include collaborations with Clutchy Hopkins, Tony Joe White, Darondo, Money Mark and Tommy Guerrero.  He also frequently performs with London-based electronica band Psapp, both on record and at live performances.

In 2011 Shawn Lee collaborated on an art exhibition with French visual artist Gerald Petit in Lyon, titled "A Conversation Piece."

Since 2011, Lee has collaborated with indie artist AM, whom he showcased with at the 2011 South By Southwest Music Festival (SXSW) in Austin, Texas. After AM heard Lee's Music and Rhythm album on the radio in Los Angeles, he decided to reach out to Lee on a now defunct social networking site.The two became quick friends, sharing a common love for 1960s psychedelia and 1970s Italian soundtracks. AM & Shawn Lee released their debut album Celestial Electric to critical acclaim in September 2011 on ESL Music. The first single from the album, "Dark Into Light," was released on limited edition 12" vinyl on the Ubiquity label April 16, 2011 in honor of Record Store Day. When Rob Garza from Thievery Corporation heard the collaboration, he signed the debut album Celestial Electric to his record label ESL (Eighteenth Street Lounge). Due to ESL restructuring to be a digital only record label, AM & Shawn Lee brought their second album La Musique Numérique to Park The Van Records.

Shawn Lee has also worked with many artists such as Lana Del Rey, Amy Winehouse, Alicia Keys, Psapp, Coldcut, Leeann Rhimes, Martina Mcbride, UNKLE, Tony Joe White, Chateau Flight, The Dust Brothers, St. Etienne, Jeff Buckley, Bomb the Bass, The Spice Girls, Natasha Atlas, Princess Superstar, Money Mark, Bei Bei, Misha Panfilov, Paul Elliot, Virgil Howe, Tim 'Love' Lee, Clutchy Hopkins, Nino Moschella and Georgia Anne Muldrow.
Most recently, he helped spawn Wild Belle.

Shawn Lee is also one half of Young Gun Silver Fox along with Andy Platts. They have released four albums: West End Coast in 2015, AM Waves in 2018 , Canyons in 2020 and Ticket to Shangri-La in 2022.

 Discography 

 Ping Pong 
- Appearances -Ubiquity – Still Cookin (Tracks: "Bebop Props") (Ubiquity, 1994)
Ubiquity – Mo' Cookin''' (Tracks: "Goin' Downhill") (Ubiquity, 1994)Ubiquity – Is That Jazz? (Tracks: "Schmoo'sville") (Ubiquity, 1995)

 The Pacific Jazz Alliance Cool Struttin (Planet Earth Recordings , 1994)

Shawn Lee 
Discomfort (Talkin' Loud, 1996)
Planet Of The Breaks (Time + Space, 1998)
Beneath the Planet Of The Breaks (Zero-G, 2000)
Monkeyboy (Wall of Sound, 2000)
Ape Breaks Vol 1-5 (Ubiquity, 2002–2003)
Soul Visa (Rush!, 2004)
Harmonium (Rush!, 2005)
Bully Original Soundtrack (Ultra, 2006)
Psychedelic Percussion (Pedigree Cuts, 2008)
Soul in the Hole (Ubiquity, 2009)
Soul in the Hole Intrumentals (Ubiquity, 2009)
Sing A Song (Ubiquity, 2010)
Sing A Song (Instrumental) (Ubiquity, 2010)
Beats Between The Sheets (Pedigree Cuts, 2012)
Synthesizers In Space (ESL Music, 2012)
Soul Food 2 (Pedigree Cuts, 2013)
Zombie Playground OST (Wonderfulsound, 2013)
Golden Age Against The Machine (Barely Breaking Even, 2014)
New York Street Funk (Pedigree Cuts, 2016)
Shawn Lee's Soul Grooves (Pedigree Cuts, 2017)
Rides Again (Légère Recordings, 2019)
Shawn Lee Kung Fu Christmas (Silver Fox Records, 2021)
Rides Yet Again (Légère Recordings, 2022)
Shawn Lee's Soulscapes (Pedigree Cuts, 2022)

- Singles & EPs -
"Cryin' Blue ('Til my Eyes are Red)" (Talkin' Loud, 1996)
"A Little Discomfort" (Talkin' Loud, 1996)
"I Can't Save You" (We Love You/WOS, 2000)
"Kill Somebody" (We Love You/WOS, 2000)
"Happiness" (We Love You/WOS, 2000)
"Unpaid Debt" (For Us/Rough Trade, 2000)
"We Love Yule" (Wall Of Sound, 2000)
"The Mattress" (Eclectic Breaks, 2004)
"So Much Trouble" (Scenario, 2004)
"Mary Jane" (BBE, 2006)
"Save The Music 12" #1" (Ubiquity, 2011)
"The Word Jam" (Paris DJs, 2013)
"Memphis (Instrumental)" (Point Blank, 2015)

- Appearances -
Ubiquity Records – Rewind! Vol. 4 (Tracks: "River Man") (Ubiquity, 2004)
Nick Phoenix – Drumdrops (Tracks: "Skin City", "Lowlander") (Extreme Music, 2005)
Exit Music: Songs with Radio Heads (Tracks: "No Surprises") (Barely Breaking Even Records and Rapster Records, 2006)
Various - Cinematic Underscores 2 (Tracks: "Hammer Time", "Blue Sky Reverie", "Death Of A Dancer", "Morning Sunshine", "From The Sky") (Pedigree Cuts, 2010)
Various - Disco Bullets (Tracks: "Disco Wristo") (Pedigree Cuts, 2010)
Various - Dope Beatz (Tracks: "Pub Grub") (Pedigree Cuts, 2010)
Blundetto - Bad bad things (Tracks: "Nautilus") (Heavenly Sweetness, 2010)
Various - Organic Downbeats (Tracks: "Secret Stash", "Slowmo") (Pedigree Cuts, 2011)
Various - Tremolo (Tracks: "Tremolow") (Pedigree Cuts, 2011)
NOMO - Upside Down/Nocturne (Tracks: "Upside Down") (Ubiquity, 2011)
Breakin Bread: Virgil Howe & Shawn Lee - Electronic Brain Break b/w Go Go Gadget Break 7" (Tracks: "Electronic Brain Break") (Breakin' Bread, 2011)
Various - Flixploitation 2 (Tracks: "The Opener", "Setting The Trap", "Vince And The Cop") (Pedigree Cuts, 2013)
The Superimposers - CDEP 1 (Tracks: "Golden (Shawn Lee Remix)", "Golden (Shawn Lee Instrumental Remix)") (Wonderfulsound, 2013)
Paris DJs Soundsystem - Killas, Thrillas & Chillas - Foot Stompers & Freaky Soul Vol.1 (Tracks: "Simon Says") (Paris DJs, 2014)
Mark Rae - Northern Sulphuric Soulboy (Tracks: "The Devil's Horns") (Mark's Music, 2016)

Shawn Lee's Ping Pong Orchestra 
Music And Rhythm (Ubiquity, 2004)
Moods And Grooves (Ubiquity, 2005)
Voices and Choices (Ubiquity, 2006)
Strings And Things (Ubiquity, 2006)
A Very Ping Pong Christmas: Funky Treats From Santa's Bag (Ubiquity, 2007)
Hits The Hits (Ubiquity, 2007)
Miles Of Styles (Ubiquity, 2008)
Under the Sun (Ubiquity, 2008)
Hooked Up Classics (Ubiquity, 2010)
World Of Funk (Ubiquity, 2011)
Reel To Reel (Ubiquity, 2012)
Techstar (Silver Fox Records, 2017)

- Singles & EPs -
Kiss The Sky EP (Ubiquity, 2006)
Miles of Smiles (Ubiquity, 2008)
Kiss The Sky (Ubiquity, 2020)
Rocket Ship (Da Do Bap Music ASCAP, 2021)

- Appearances -
Thievery Corporation – Jazz Lounge 3 (Tracks: "A Gentle Dissolve (Shawn Lee Ping Pong Orchestra Remix)") (Water Music Records, 2007)

Shawn Lee's Incredible Tabla Band 
Tabla Rock (Ubiquity, 2011)

- Singles & EPs -
Apache b/w Bongo Rock '73 (Ubiquity, 2019)

Shawn Lee & Clutchy Hopkins 
Clutch Of The Tiger (Ubiquity, 2008)
Fascinating Fingers (Ubiquity, 2009)

Bei Bei & Shawn Lee 
Beauty and the Beats (Ubiquity, 2009)
Into The Wind (Ubiquity, 2010)
Year Of The Funky (Légère Recordings, 2017)

Lord Newborn and The Magic Skulls 
Lord Newborn and The Magic Skulls (Ubiquity, 2009)

AM & Shawn Lee 
Paris DJs Betamix (Paris DJs, 2011)
Celestial Electric (ESL Music, 2011)
Remixed Vol. 2 (ESL Music, 2012)
La Musique Numérique (Park the Van, 2013) 
Replayed Remix Album (Park the Van, 2013)
Instrumentally AM & Shawn Lee Vol. 1 (AM Sounds, 2013)
Instrumentally AM & Shawn Lee Vol. 2 (AM Sounds, 2013)
AM & Shawn Lee Mixtapes (AM Sounds, 2014)
Outlines (AM Sounds, 2015)

- Singles & EPs -
Dark Into Light (ESL, 2011)
Automatic (Park the Van, 2013)
You Are In My System (AM Sounds, 2015)
Ocean (AM Sounds, 2015)

Tim Love Lee / Shawn Lee 
New York Trouble / Electric Progression (Tummy Touch Records, 2013)

Electric Peanut Butter Company 
Trans-Atlantic Pysch Classics Vol. 2 (Ubiquity, 2013)
Trans-Atlantic Psych Classics Vol. 1 (Ubiquity, 2014)

Young Gun Silver Fox (w/ Andy Platts) 
West End Coast (Légère Recordings, 2015)
AM Waves (Légère Recordings, 2018)
Canyons (Légère Recordings, 2020)
Ticket to Shangri-La (Légère Recordings, 2022)
Tip Of The Flame (12" Disco Mix) (Légère Recordings, 2023)

Shawn Lee and The Soul Surfers 
Shawn Lee and The Soul Surfers (Silver Fox Records, 2018)

Shawn Lee & Paul Elliott 
Mexican Marimba (Légère Recordings, 2019)

Misha Panfilov & Shawn Lee 
Mic Wallace / Miraggio (Fnr, 2019)
Paradise Cove (Fnr, 2020)
Space & Tempo (Fnr, 2022)

The Shawn Lee Rides Again Band 

- Singles & EPs -
Wichita Lineman (Yeah! Yeah! Yeah! Sessions) (Légère Recordings, 2020)

Shawn Lee's Incredible Leg Warmer Band 
The 37-Minute Workout (Légère Recordings, 2020)

Oregano 

- Singles & EPs -
Melting Sand/Transmitter (Delights, 2021)

The Superhighway Band 
Studio City (Légère Recordings, 2021)

- Singles & EPs -
Catalina (Légère Recordings, 2022)

Shawn Lee & The Angels Of Libra 

- Singles & EPs -
Bless My Soul (Légère Recordings, 2022)

Video game soundtracks 
 The Getaway (2002)
 Bully (2006)
 Zombie Playground (2013)

Film soundtracks 
 Under the Sun (2008)
 Elevate
 Save Angel Hope

References

External links
 
 Ubiquity Records profile
 MundoVibe.com Interview With Shawn Lee

Living people
American funk musicians
American jazz musicians
American soul musicians
Musicians from Wichita, Kansas
Ubiquity Records artists
1963 births
American male musicians
American expatriates in England
American male jazz musicians
Talkin' Loud artists